Jorinde van Klinken (born 2 February 2000) is a Dutch athlete competing in the shot put and discus throw. Her personal best of 70.22m is the current (2021) Dutch record in the discus  throw. She represented her country in the discus at the 2019 World Championships in Doha without reaching the final. In the same year, she won a gold medal in the shot put at the 2019 European U20 Championships. On 20 May 2021, she qualified for the Tokyo Olympics with a throw of 65.94m at the Tucson Elite Classic.

Education 
Van Klinken completed her undergraduate degree from Utrecht University in her home country. She is currently pursuing her graduate degree at Arizona State University (ASU) in Tempe, Arizona, USA where she represents the Sun Devils in both discus and shot put.

Career 
In May 2021, Van Klinken qualified for the Tokyo Olympics when she threw a personal best of 65.94 during the Tucson Elite Classic held in Tucson, USA. On 23 May 2021, at the USA Track Throws Festival, she threw the discus 70.22m which not only gave her a new personal best but also broke the Dutch national record and created a new world leading distance. With this throw she became the second European woman to cross the 70m mark this century after two-time Olympic Champion, Sandra Perkovic of Croatia and put her amongst the medal contenders at the Tokyo Olympics. In August 2022 Van Klinken won the bronze medal in shot put at the European Athletics Championships.

International competitions

Personal bests
Outdoor
Shot put – 18m45 (Tucson 30 April 2022)
Discus throw – 70m22 (Tucson 23 May 2021)
Hammer throw – 58m15 (Alphen aan den Rijn 29 June 2019)
Indoor
Shot put – 19m08 (Birmingham 13 March 2022)

References

2000 births
Living people
Dutch female shot putters
Dutch female discus throwers
World Athletics Championships athletes for the Netherlands
Athletes (track and field) at the 2020 Summer Olympics
Arizona State Sun Devils women's track and field athletes
Olympic athletes of the Netherlands
21st-century Dutch women
European Athletics Championships medalists